|}

The King George Stakes is a Group 2 flat horse race in Great Britain open to horses aged three years or older. It is run at Goodwood over a distance of 5 furlongs (1,006 metres), and it is scheduled to take place each year in late July or early August.

History
The event was established in 1911, and it was founded to commemorate the coronation of King George V.

The present system of race grading was introduced in 1971, and for a period the King George Stakes was classed at Group 3 level.

The car manufacturer Audi sponsored the race from 2005 to 2011, and for several years it was known as the Audi Stakes. It was sponsored by Gordon's Gin in 2012 and by Betfred since 2013. It was promoted to Group 2 status in 2010.

The King George Stakes is currently held on the fourth day of the five-day Glorious Goodwood meeting. The leading participants often go on to compete in the Nunthorpe Stakes, and the last to win both races in the same year was Battaash in 2019.

Records

Most successful horse (4 wins):
 Battaash - 2017, 2018, 2019, 2020

Leading jockey (9 wins):
 Lester Piggott – Right Boy (1958, 1959), Matatina (1964), Pugnacity (1965), Raffingora (1970), Constans (1971), Valeriga (1980), Tina's Pet (1982), Anita's Prince (1984)

Leading trainer (5 wins):
 Charles Hills – Battaash (2017, 2018, 2019, 2020), Khaadem (2022)

Winners since 1980

Earlier winners

 1911: Spanish Prince
 1912: Golden Rod
 1913: Hornet's Beauty
 1914: Harmonicon
 1915–18: no race
 1919: Chiffre d'Amour
 1920: Tetratema
 1921: Tetratema
 1922: Roman Bachelor
 1923: Sicyon
 1924: Mumtaz Mahal
 1925: Diomedes
 1926: Oojah
 1927: Endowment
 1928: Queen's Bower
 1929: Tiffin
 1930: Stingo
 1931: Stingo
 1932: Clustine
 1933: Myrobella
 1934: Old Riley
 1935: Strathcarron
 1936: Veuve Clicquot
 1937: Veuve Clicquot
 1938: Neuvy
 1939: Mickey the Greek
 1940: no race
 1941: Antecedent *
 1942–45: no race
 1946: Honeyway
 1947: Daily Mail
 1948: Royal Barge
 1949: Abernant
 1950: Abernant
 1951: Bakshishi
 1952: Royal Serenade
 1953: Fairy Flax
 1954: Four of Spades
 1955: Democratic
 1956: Palariva
 1957: Refined
 1958: Right Boy
 1959: Right Boy
 1960: Bleep-Bleep
 1961: Floribunda
 1962: La Tendresse
 1963: Secret Step
 1964: Matatina
 1965: Pugnacity
 1966: Polyfoto
 1967: Right Strath
 1968: So Blessed
 1969: Laser Light
 1970: Raffingora
 1971: Constans
 1972: Stilvi
 1973: Sandford Lad
 1974: Singing Bede
 1975: Auction Ring
 1976: Music Boy
 1977: Scarcely Blessed
 1978: Music Maestro
 1979: Ahonoora

* The 1941 running took place at Newmarket.

See also
 Horse racing in Great Britain
 List of British flat horse races

References

 Paris-Turf: 
 Racing Post:

 galopp-sieger.de – King George Stakes.
 ifhaonline.org – International Federation of Horseracing Authorities – King George Stakes (2019).
 pedigreequery.com – King George Stakes – Goodwood.
 

Flat races in Great Britain
Goodwood Racecourse
Open sprint category horse races
Recurring sporting events established in 1911
1911 establishments in England